Pimoroni Ltd is a hobbyist electronics company based in Sheffield, Yorkshire, UK.

Founded in 2012, the company has grown to more than 30 people and operates from two nearby properties in Sheffield city centre, as well as a third in Essen, Germany, which opened in 2017. In 2017 they were named the second fastest growing manufacturing company in the UK by the University of Sheffield

Through an online store, and at community events, they are a re-seller for a number of electronics and education brands, as well as manufacturing a range of electronics and associated products. Their original product was an Acrylic plastic case for the Raspberry Pi computer (which has now sold in excess of 175,000 units), and their range now includes a selection of add-on boards and components for this and other small computers.

Their 'Picade' arcade machine kit was the UK's first Kickstarter campaign.

By 1 July 2019 they had successfully raised £93,480 on Kickstarter for their new retro style console called '32blit'.

References

External links

Pimoroni

Consumer electronics retailers of the United Kingdom
Retail companies established in 2012
Electronic component distributors
Companies based in Sheffield